Scoparia alticola is a moth in the family Crambidae. It was described by Edward Meyrick in 1935. It is found in the Democratic Republic of the Congo (Orientale) and Uganda.

References

Moths described in 1935
Scorparia